Rosa 'David Thompson'  is a deep pink, Hybrid rugosa cultivar, bred by Canadian rose breeder, Felicitas Svejda in 1970. It was introduced in Canada in 1979 by Agriculture and Agri-Food Canada. It is one of the Canadian Explorer roses that Svejda developed and named in honour of  legendary Canadian explorers.

Description
'David Thompson'  is a medium, bushy Hybrid rugosa rose,  in height, with a  spread. It has a double, cupped bloom form of medium-sized  flowers. Blooms vary in color from  purplish-pink to deep red. Flowers often display streaks of white and the stamens are pale yellow. They are borne in short-stemmed clusters of 3 to 7. The rose has a strong, sweet scent. The rose blooms in flushes throughout the season. It is a very hardy plant and is disease resistant. The leaves are small and medium green in colour, and have a tendency to turn brown at the edges.

History

Felicitas Svejda
Felicitas Svejda was born November 8, 1920, in Vienna, Austria. She studied agricultural science at the University of Natural Resources and Life Sciences  in Vienna, where she earned a PhD in 1948. She moved to Canada in 1953, and was hired by the Canadian Department of Agriculture's research division in Ottawa, Ontario. Her first project was researching cereal grains, but later began working with ornamental plants. Svejda was given a new project in 1961 to create a series of winter hardy roses, which would thrive in the coldest regions of Canada, with sub-freezing winter temperatures of -50 C, and would also flower regularly during Canada's short growing season.

With no prior knowledge of roses, Svejvda developed a successful rose-breeding program at the Central Experimental Farm (CEF) in Ottawa. From the 1960s to the 1980s, she introduced many new cultivars, including 22 roses in the Explorer Rose Series, named in honour of Canadian explorers. Some of her most popular cultivars are: 'John Cabot', 'Alexander MacKenzie',  'Henry Kelsey', and 'Jens Munk'. Svejvda led the rose-breeding program at CEF for 25 years, until her retirement in 1985. Her roses continued to be introduced in Canada well into the 1990s. Svejda died Jan. 19, 2016 in Ottawa at the age 95.

'David Thompson' 
Svejda bred 'David Thompson' in 1970 using two Hybrid rugosas, 'Schneezwerg' x 'Fru Dagmar Hastrup'. The rose cultivar was introduced in Canada in 1979 by Agriculture and Agri-Food Canada. It is one of the Explorer Roses that Svejda developed to withstand the harsh Canadian winters and thrive in its short growing season. The rose was named for David Thompson (1770–1857), a British-Canadian fur trader, surveyor, and cartographer.

Notes

Sources
 
 

David Thompson
1979 introductions